John Leary (6 October 1867 – 16 January 1940) was an Australian cricketer. He played in one first-class match for Queensland in 1898/99.

See also
 List of Queensland first-class cricketers

References

External links
 

1867 births
1940 deaths
Australian cricketers
Queensland cricketers
People from Bathurst, New South Wales
Cricketers from New South Wales